Joseph Boye Lomotey was a Ghanaian diplomat. He served as Ghana's ambassador to Yugoslavia from 1969 to 1970.

Early life and education 
Lomotey had his early formative years at a missionary school in Accra before joining the Accra Academy for his secondary education. In 1952, he enrolled at Xavier University, New Orleans on a Phelps Stokes Fund scholarship, for his undergraduate degree which he obtained in 1955. While at Xavier University, he was the head of the All African Students Union of the Americas. He was also editor of the school's campus newspaper from 1952 to 1955. Following his undergraduate studies, Lomotey pursued his postgraduate studies at the New York School of Social Work, Columbia University, on a Hishhorn fellowship. While at Columbia University, he was selected to attend the Students International Assembly in Williamsburg, Virginia, based on his qualifications, academic record, and purpose for attendance. He obtained his master's degree in Social Work from Columbia University in 1957.

Career 
After his secondary education, Lomotey worked for about twelve years in the Ghana civil service. He resigned in 1952 to further his education in the United States of America.

Upon his return to Ghana, Lomotey joined the Ghana foreign service where he worked as the Director of the division of the United Nations and International Organisations. He also served as an Executive Officer  of Ghana's permanent mission to the United Nations. Prior to his ambassadorial appointment to Yugoslavia, he was the acting High Commissioner to India, and later deputy High Commissioner to India. He served as Ghana's ambassador to Yugoslavia from 1969 to 1970, when he was replaced by Alhaji Yakubu Tali, Tolon Na. During the Acheampong regime, he was appointed secretary of the National Council for Higher Education. He also served as a member of the University of Ghana council.

References 

Ghanaian diplomats
People from Accra
Ga-Adangbe people
Alumni of the Accra Academy
Xavier University of Louisiana alumni
Columbia University School of Social Work alumni
Ghanaian civil servants